Visions of Passion is a 2003 American made for cable erotic drama film directed by Randall St. George.

Plot
A filmmaker spies on her neighbors.

Background
The film was produced by the production company Rosebud Films and distributed by Silhouette Entertainment Group. It was broadcast several times in Summer 2003 at fixed times and on demand on the premium channel Showtime. It was released on DVD on December 7, 2004.

Reception
The film was given 1.5 out of 4 by Dr. Gore's Movie Reviews.

References

External links
 
 
 

2003 television films
2003 films
American erotic drama films
2000s erotic drama films
2000s English-language films
2000s American films